Graeme Julian Samuel AC (born 31 May 1946) is an Australian businessman. He was the Managing Director and head of the Melbourne office of M&A advisory firm Greenhill Caliburn, and is a member of the Australian National University Council. He previously served as the chairman of the Australian Competition & Consumer Commission from 1 July 2003 to 31 July 2011.

Early life and education
Samuel was educated at Wesley College, Melbourne, and studied law at both the University of Melbourne (LLB) and Monash University (LLM). He has had a long career in law, working as a partner in Melbourne law firm Phillips Fox & Masel, and in business served as the executive director of Macquarie Bank from 1981 to 1986.

Career
Samuel has also had extensive involvement in senior levels of sports management in Australia. Samuel was a member of the Australian Rugby League Commission, which governs the NRL and is a former commissioner of the Australian Football League (he became a life member of the league in 1995). During his time as AFL commissioner, Samuel was one of the so-called "faceless men" who were vilified by supporters during the attempted merger or relocation of clubs such as Footscray, Fitzroy, Melbourne and Hawthorn.

On 3 May 1995, The Age highlighted Samuel's vision for the future of the AFL under the title 'The Samuel Vision' — which included the following major points:
 Port Adelaide's entry to the AFL is a priority
 The AFL is being damaged by maintaining 11 clubs in Victoria
 Fitzroy should consider merging with Brisbane
 Commission should no longer deal with issues of discipline
 Waverley Park's future will depend on how many clubs are in the competition
 A minimum salary cap should be considered for clubs
 Western Oval is not necessarily the best place for Footscray
 Minimum level of contribution to AFL revenue a condition of clubs keeping license

Samuel was also the chairman of the Melbourne and Olympic Parks Trust, which oversees both Melbourne Park and Olympic Park.

In July 2012, Samuel was appointed Chairman of the Victorian Taxi Services Commission following the Victorian Government's initiative to clean up and provide better regulation around the taxi cab industry. The Government's Taxi Industry Inquiry headed by Allan Fels recommended sweeping reforms to improve taxi services in Victoria.  Samuel is charged with overseeing on the ground implementation of Fels' reforms.

From 29 October 2019, Samuel conducted the second independent review of the EPBC Act, supported by an expert panel. The final report was submitted on 30 October 2020 to the Minister of the Environment.

Not For Profit roles
Chair of Dementia Australia

Recognition
On 8 June 1998 he was appointed an Officer of the Order of Australia.

On 14 June 2010 he was promoted to Companion of the Order of Australia in the Queens's Birthday Honours list for services to the community, public administration, economic reform and corporate law.

On 1 January 2001 he was awarded the Centenary Medal.

On 16 January 2001 he was awarded the Australian Sports Medal.

References

External links
Monash University prominent alumni profile
Australian Telecommunications Users Group biography 
 Terry Lane interviews Graeme Samuel -  Big Ideas Radio National May 2006

1946 births
Living people
Australian Jews
Australian businesspeople
Australian public servants
Australian Rugby League Commissioners
Lawyers from Melbourne
People educated at Wesley College (Victoria)
Melbourne Law School alumni
Monash Law School alumni
Companions of the Order of Australia
Recipients of the Centenary Medal
Recipients of the Australian Sports Medal